Jean-Pierre Moris (7 June 1903 – 31 January 1985) was a Luxembourgian swimmer. He competed in the men's 100 metre backstroke event at the 1924 Summer Olympics.

References

External links
 

1903 births
1985 deaths
Luxembourgian male swimmers
Olympic swimmers of Luxembourg
Swimmers at the 1924 Summer Olympics
People from Pétange
Male backstroke swimmers